Thompson Springs, also officially known for a time as just Thompson, is a small census-designated place in central Grand County, Utah, United States. The population was 39 at the 2010 census. The town is just north of the east–west highway route shared by Interstate 70, U.S. Route 6 and U.S. Route 50, between Crescent Junction and Cisco. The town's ZIP code is 84540.
The mystery "The Silver Spur Cafe" by Chinle Miller is partially set in Thompson Springs.

History
Evidence of human habitation or use of the Thompson Springs area can be dated back to the Archaic Period, when beautiful pictographs were left in Thompson Canyon. Subsequent Anasazi, Fremont, and Ute tribes have also left their mark upon the area. The site of this rock art in Thompson Canyon has been designated as the Thompson Wash Rock Art District. 

Thompson Springs was named for E.W. Thompson, who lived near the springs and operated a sawmill to the north near the Book Cliffs. The town began life in the late nineteenth century as a station stop on the Denver and Rio Grande Western Railroad (D&RGW), which had been completed through the area in 1883. A post office at the site was established in 1890, under the name "Thompson's". (The official designation by the United States Postal Service is still "Thompson".) The town was a community center for the small number of farmers and ranchers living in the inhospitable region, and it was also a prominent shipping point for cattle that were run in the Book Cliffs area. Stockmen from both San Juan and Grand counties used Thompson.

Thompson gained importance in the early twentieth century due to the development of coal mines in Sego Canyon, north of town.  Commercial mining in Sego Canyon began in 1911, and that year the Ballard and Thompson Railroad was constructed to connect the mines with the railhead at Thompson. The railroad branch line and mines continued operating until about 1950.

For many years the city was served by various D&RGW passenger trains, including the Scenic Limited, the Exposition Flyer, the Prospector, the California Zephyr (where it was a flag stop, though the timetable for 1969 shows it as a regular stop), and the Rio Grande Zephyr. Although Amtrak (the National Railroad Passenger Corporation) took over nearly all passenger rail service in the United States in 1971, the D&RGW continued service through the area until 1983. Subsequently, for the next fourteen years, the city was served by various Amtrak trains, including the California Zephyr, the Desert Wind, and the Pioneer.

Construction of I-70 two miles south of Thompson Springs drew traffic away from the city as the former Old Cisco Highway (US 6 and US-50) (now named Frontage Road) was no longer used.

The original name for this settlement was "Thompson Springs", a name that was reinstated in 1985. Much of the town is uninhabited today, although there are still some operating businesses in the immediate vicinity of I-70.

Demographics
As of the census of 2010, there were 39 people living in the CDP. There were 43 housing units. The racial makeup of the town was 94.9% White, and 5.1% from two or more races. Hispanic or Latino of any race were 0% of the population.

Transportation
While the community is situated just north of Interstate 70/U.S. Route 6/U.S. Route 50 (I‑70/US‑6/US‑50), the community is connected to that transportation corridor by State Route 94, which runs south from the center of town to an interchange with I‑70/US‑6/US‑50. Prior to the construction of I‑70, US‑6/US‑50 ran through the center of town.

Thompson Wash Rock Art District

The district includes several well-preserved groups petroglyphs (images etched into the rock surface) and pictographs (images painted onto the rock surface) left by early Native Americans in three different styles (each with their own panel): Fremont, Ute and Barrier Canyon. As such it provides fairly rare opportunity to compare all three the styles in one location, particularly a site that is easily accessible. The Fremont culture thrived from A.D. 600 to 1250 and was contemporary with the Anasazi culture of the Four Corners area. The Archaic period dated from 7000 B.C., while the Barrier Canyon period from around 400 A.D., and the Ute tribe dating from A.D. 1300.

See also

 List of census-designated places in Utah

Notes

References

External links

Archaic period in North America
Census-designated places in Utah
Census-designated places in Grand County, Utah
Denver and Rio Grande Western Railroad
Populated places established in 1893
1893 establishments in Utah Territory